Tom Cannon may refer to:

 Tom Cannon (wrestler) (born 1852), British wrestler
 Tom Cannon Sr. (1846–1917), British flat racing jockey and trainer
 Thomas Cannon (footballer) (born 2002), English-born Irish footballer